Ellen Martha Clancy Stuart (January 23, 1919 – October 15, 2001), known professionally as Janet Shaw, was an American actress.

Born on January 23, 1919, in Beatrice, Nebraska, Shaw was picked as the finest baby in Nebraska when she was 18 months old. She was the daughter of Philip Windsor Clancy. After attending elementary schools in Nebraska, she attended high schools in Santa Monica and Beverly Hills, graduating from the latter. Actress Olive May was her aunt.

Shaw acted on stage with the Beverly Hills Little Theater, the Gateway Little Theater, and the Pasadena Community Players. 

Shaw appeared in the films Prairie Thunder, Alcatraz Island, Sergeant Murphy, Jezebel, Accidents Will Happen, The Adventures of Robin Hood, Gold Diggers in Paris, The Sisters, Torchy Blane in Chinatown, The Rookie Cop, The Old Maid, Waterloo Bridge, Flight Angels, Hired Wife, Escape, Lucky Devils, Blossoms in the Dust, Gambling Daughters, Johnny Eager, Night Monster, Shadow of a Doubt, How's About It, Hi'ya, Chum, Hangmen Also Die!, False Faces, Arizona Trail, Ladies Courageous, Johnny Doesn't Live Here Any More, The Scarlet Clue, I'll Tell the World, Jungle Raiders, Sensation Hunters, The Scarlet Horseman, Nocturne, Time Out of Mind and They Won't Believe Me, among others.

On April 19, 1944, in Beverly Hills, Shaw married Willard Ilefeldt, a former actor who was serving in the Army Air Forces.

She died of Alzheimer's disease on October 15, 2001, in Beatrice, Nebraska at age 82.

Filmography

References

External links
 

1919 births
2001 deaths
Actresses from Nebraska
20th-century American actresses
American film actresses
Western (genre) film actresses
American stage actresses
People from Beatrice, Nebraska
Neurological disease deaths in Nebraska
Deaths from Alzheimer's disease